Raccontami is an Italian television drama series that was broadcast on Rai 1 from 2006 to 2008. It recounts the experiences of a middle-class family, the Ferrucci, from 1960 to 1966.

Development
The series is an adaptation of Cuéntame cómo pasó, a Spanish series by Televisión Española starring Imanol Arias and Ana Duato.

There was a third season initially confirmed but later cancelled. This third season would recount the Ferrucci story from 1967 to 1970.

Cast and characters

Ferrucci Family

Episodes

See also
 List of Italian television series

References

Further reading

External links
 

RAI original programming
Italian television series
2000s Italian television series
2006 Italian television series debuts
2008 Italian television series endings
Television series set in the 1960s
Italian television series based on Spanish television series